Khadia is an area of central Ahmedabad, Gujarat, India. There are pol and heritage houses in the town.

Khadia was allotted a seat in Gujarat Vidhan Sabha. Ashok Bhatt won from there 8 times in a row. In 1975 as member of Jana Sangh, and 7 times from 1980 to 2007 as member of BJP.  From 2012, the old seats of Khadia and Jamalpur have been merged into one seat.

See also
 List of pols in Ahmedabad
 Jamalpur-Khadiya (Vidhan Sabha constituency)

References

Neighbourhoods in Ahmedabad